Le Conte station is a light rail station on the Muni Metro T Third Street line in the Bayview neighborhood of San Francisco, California. The station opened with the T Third Street line on January 13, 2007. It has a single island platform located in the median of Third Street south of Le Conte Avenue. The station is located in an open cut between the travel lanes of Third Street, which rise south of Le Conte Avenue to pass over Candlestick Hill and the Bayshore Freeway. South of the station, the line also rises to pass over the hill and highway.

References

External links 

SFMTA: Third Street & Le Conte Ave northbound, southbound
SF Bay Transit (unofficial): Third Street & Le Conte Ave

Muni Metro stations
Railway stations in the United States opened in 2007